is the 19th major single by the Japanese idol group Cute, set for release in Japan on September 5, 2012.

Background 
The song "Aitai Aitai Aitai na" was premiered at the first concert of the Hello! Project 15th Anniversary Live 2012 Summer tour, on July 21 at the Onyx Theater in Osaka.  The single will be released in five versions: Regular Edition and Limited Editions A, B, C, and D.  The Regular Edition and the Limited Edition D are CD-only. The Limited Editions A, B, and C include a DVD.  All the limited editions are shipped sealed and include a serial-numbered entry card for the lottery to win a ticket to one of the single's launch events.

Chart performance 
The single debuted at number 3 in the daily Oricon chart.

Track listing

Regular Edition, Limited Edition A

Limited Editions B, C, D

Bonus 
Sealed into all the limited editions:
 Event ticket lottery card with a serial number

Charts

References

External links 
 
 

2012 singles
Japanese-language songs
Cute (Japanese idol group) songs
Songs written by Tsunku
Song recordings produced by Tsunku
Zetima Records singles
2012 songs